Embratel  is a major Brazilian telecommunications company headquartered in Rio de Janeiro. The company was the long distance arm of Telebras until it was bought by the U.S. company MCI Communications for 2.65 billion reais during the 1998 break-up of Telebras. However, MCI Communications went bankrupt in 2003. Since 2003, it is owned by América Móvil, the Mexican telecommunications giant.

Embratel is a major player in both voice and data communication in Brazil. The company owns a fully digitized microwave communications and fiber optic networks as well as eight domestic communication satellites. The company is a member of the Intelsat and Inmarsat organizations and it owns four fiber optics submarine cable systems - UNISUR, Americas II, Atlantis-2 and Columbus III.

Embratel's stock was traded on BM&F Bovespa.

In Heraldry
Some of the company's equipment is represented on the coat of arms of Tanguá, Brazil.

Via Embratel subscription TV service
In 2008, Embratel launched its pay TV service. It was named Via Embratel and operates in Ku Band on satellite Star One C2. The service is currently branded Claro TV+ DTH.

See also 
 Embratel Star One
 List of internet service providers in Brazil

External links 
 The company's home page in English
 Claro hdtv package at Lyngsat

Telecommunications companies of Brazil
Internet service providers of Brazil
Companies based in Rio de Janeiro (city)
Brazilian brands
América Móvil
Privatized companies of Brazil